Juraj Beneš  (2 March 1940 in Trnava, Slovak State – 11 September 2004 in Bratislava, Slovakia) was a Slovak composer, teacher, and pianist.

He graduated from the university called Academy of Performing Arts in Bratislava (VŠMU) and was a pupil of Ján Cikker, who was one of the best known Slovak composers. Since 1983 Beneš taught at the same university.

Beneš's work followed current trends and spanned genres. He was best in composing operas such as Cisárove nové šaty (The Emperor's New Clothes), Skamenený (Petrified), and Hostina (Feast) and often employed the human voice together with unusual instrument combinations as in Tri ženské zbory (Three Women's Choir).

External links
Biography and list of works 

1940 births
2004 deaths
Musicians from Trnava
20th-century classical composers
Slovak composers
Male composers
Slovak pianists
Male classical composers
20th-century pianists
Male pianists
20th-century male musicians
Slovak male musicians